Tee'd Off is a pinball machine designed by Ray Tanzer and Jon Norris
and released by Gottlieb in May 1993.

Description
The table is often compared to No Good Gofers by Williams and features a Caddyshack type theme. An animatronic gopher named Gunther shrug shoulders in sync with voice during game play and sometimes during attract mode at the top of the backbox and mocks the player.

The game has a hole in one shot at the top, a roulette wheel toy, 3 flippers, 1 pop bumper, 2 vertical upkickers, 3 slingshots, 2 kick-out holes, 2 bullseye targets, 1 four-bank drop target, 1 captive ball and 1 captive ball spinner below center of playfield.

The main objective of the table is to complete all 9 holes in right order. The game includes a pitch and putt mini playfield and mini-games like find-the-gopher. After all holes are lit an award is given depending on how many times all holes have been completed. The game has 5 modes that are started by shooting the volcano when lit. Completing all modes lights the big score target.

Design team
 Concept: Ed Krynski
 Producer: Norm Avelar
 Graphics: Richard Browne
 Programming: Eugene Geer, Scott Slomiany
 Game Design: Jon Norris, Ray Tanzer
 Software: Rand Paulin
 Mechanics: Ed Krynski
 Artwork: Constantino Mitchell, David Moore, Jeanine Mitchell
 Animation: Ed Krynski, Rand Paulin, Adrian Carmack
 Music: Dave Zabriskie
 Sound: Craig Beierwaltes

Game quotes
 "Looks like you need some serious help."
 "TEMPER TEMPER! IS THAT A RANGE BALL YOU'RE USING!?"
 "Did anybody teach you how to play this game?"
 "I CAN'T TAKE MUCH MORE!!!"
 "Hey, you got your eyes open or what?"
 "Where do you think the old gopher might be hiding today?"

Digital versions
Tee'd Off is a playable licensed table in The Pinball Arcade for several platforms and also included in the Pinball Hall of Fame: The Gottlieb Collection.

References

External links
Internet Pinball Database entry for Tee'd Off
Pinball Archive Rule Sheet

Gottlieb pinball machines